Pierre Cazaux (born 7 June 1984) is a French former road cyclist.

Major results

2007
 6th Overall Tour des Pyrénées
2008
 4th Tour du Doubs
2009
 4th Classic Loire Atlantique
 5th Boucles de l'Aulne
 8th Overall Paris–Corrèze
 9th Trophée des Grimpeurs

Grand Tour general classification results timeline

References

External links

Pierre Cazaux profile at 

1984 births
Living people
French male cyclists
People from Lower Navarre
Sportspeople from Pyrénées-Atlantiques
Cyclists from Nouvelle-Aquitaine